Teruya (written: 照屋) is a Japanese surname. Notable people with the surname include:

, Japanese physician
, Japanese artist

Japanese-language surnames